The proper palmar digital nerves of the ulnar nerve are nerves of the hand.

The superficial branch of the ulnar nerve divides into a proper palmar digital nerve, which supplies the medial side of the fifth digit and a common palmar digital nerve which divides into two proper palmar digital nerves that supply the adjacent sides of the fourth and fifth digits.

Additional images

References 

Nerves of the upper limb